Point Breeze could refer to:

 Point Breeze, New Jersey
 Point Breeze, Pittsburgh, Pennsylvania
 Point Breeze, Philadelphia, Pennsylvania
 Point Breeze, the New Jersey estate of Joseph Bonaparte 
 Point Breeze, the mouth of the Oak Orchard River in New York

See also
 Breezy Point (disambiguation)
 Point (disambiguation)
 Breeze (disambiguation)